Richard Hobbs (1833 – 16 July 1910) was a 19th-century Member of Parliament from the Auckland and Northland regions in New Zealand.

His father was the missionary John Hobbs.

Richard was born in Hokitika, see obituaries:

Member of Parliament

He represented the Franklin electorate from 20 May  to 15 August 1879 when he was defeated, and the Bay of Islands electorate from 9 December  to 3 October 1890, when he retired.

Death  
He died in Herne Bay, Ponsonby, Auckand, see death notices:

References

|-

Members of the New Zealand House of Representatives
1833 births
1910 deaths
Unsuccessful candidates in the 1879 New Zealand general election
New Zealand MPs for North Island electorates
19th-century New Zealand politicians
Auckland City Councillors